The 2010–11 Polska Liga Hokejowa season was the 76th season of the Polska Liga Hokejowa, the top level of ice hockey in Poland. 10 teams participated in the league, and KS Cracovia won the championship.

Regular season

Playoffs

Quarterfinals
KS Cracovia - Zaglebie Sosnowiec 3-0 on series
JKH GKS Jasztrebie - KH Sanok 3-2 on series
GKS Tychy - Stoczniowiec Gdansk 3-1 on series
Unia Oswiecim - Podhale Nowy Targ 3-2 on series

Semifinals
KS Cracovia - JKH GKS Jasztrebie 3-1 on series
GKS Tychy - Unia Oswiecim 3-2 on series

Final
KS Cracovia - GKS Tychy 3-1 on series

3rd place
Unia Oswiecim - JKH GKS Jasztrebie 3-1 on series

Play-downs 
 KTH Krynica - Naprzód Janów 3:2 (4:3 n.V., 1:6, 4:3, 0:1, 4:3)

Relegation 
 KTH Krynica - GKS Katowice 4:0 (4:3 n.V., 6:1, 7:1, 4:2)

References
 Season on hockeyarchives.info

Polska Hokej Liga seasons
Polska
Polska